Anastasios Dimitriadis (born 27 February 1997) is a Greek professional footballer who plays as an attacking midfielder for Super League 2 club Egaleo.

Career

PAOK

On 1 July 2016 PAOK announced the extension of his contract for four years. On 31 January 2017, he signed a six months loan with Slovak club MFK Zemplín Michalovce on loan from PAOK.

References

External links

1997 births
Living people
Greek footballers
Greek expatriate footballers
Super League Greece players
PAOK FC players
Apollon Pontou FC players
A.E. Karaiskakis F.C. players
Footballers from Thessaloniki
Association football midfielders